Victor Varnado (born May 15, 1969) is an American stand-up comedian and actor. He is African American and albinistic. He was born legally blind due to his albinism. He grew up in Huntsville, Alabama and later moved to Minneapolis, Minnesota.

Career

In Minneapolis, Varnado worked with the local improvisation troupes ComedySportz, The Bad Mamma Jammas and several regional theater companies, before landing his first role in the Big River Productions film Full Moon Rising, playing a copy clerk.

Soon after, his role in Giraffe Films' Kids Adventures in Oz spurred him on move to New York to pursue an acting career. His first "big break" came when he landed a role in Elton John's music video "Recover Your Soul".

Shortly after, he had a role in Harmony Korine's Julien Donkey-Boy (1999) with Ewen Bremner, Werner Herzog and Chloë Sevigny. He was subsequently cast in Universal's feature film End of Days (1999), starring Arnold Schwarzenegger. He was cast in a supporting role in Eddie Murphy's space-age comic thriller, The Adventures of Pluto Nash (2002).

Varnado was the winner of the Most Valuable Performer award in the 2001 Montreal Just For Laughs Improv Championship and bronze medalist in the 2002 Comedy Central Laugh Riots National Stand-Up Competition.  He co-starred as Otis, an outrageous urban comic, in the independent film Hacks. Shown in the New York International Film Festival playing in Los Angeles, Hacks was an official selection for The Milan Film Festival.

Varnado worked on a superhero film with comic book legend Stan Lee. He has performed character voices for a video game for Sony PlayStation 3 called Rat Race.

Varnado is a member of Chicago City Limits, New York's longest running comedy improv theater company for which he was a writer and director as well as a regularly performing stand up comedian. He has also been a guest on the popular podcast Keith and The Girl.

Varnado is the CEO of Supreme Robot Pictures, a production company that produced a mini-series for Penguin Random House called "The Great Fantasy Debate" and a stand-up comedy special event called "Bring Back Laughs"

Filmography

References

External links
Official website (2013 snapshot)
Victor Varnado on MySpace

1969 births
Living people
American stand-up comedians
American male film actors
People with albinism
Male actors from Indiana
Actors from Huntsville, Alabama
African-American male actors
People from Gary, Indiana
21st-century American comedians
21st-century African-American people
20th-century African-American people